The Clemson Tigers college basketball team competes in the National Collegiate Athletic Association's (NCAA) Division I, representing Clemson University in the Atlantic Coast Conference.  Clemson has played its home games at Littlejohn Coliseum in Clemson, South Carolina since its opening in 1968.

Clemson fielded its first intercollegiate men's basketball team during the 1911–12 season. The school's athletics teams are known as the "Tigers". In 1921, Clemson and thirteen other members left the Southern Intercollegiate Athletic Association to form the Southern Conference. After relatively poor showing early, the Tigers won the 1939 conference tournament, their only men's basketball conference championship.

Clemson and six other schools left the Southern Conference in 1953 and formed the Atlantic Coast Conference.  On two occasions, the Tigers reached the final of the ACC tournament.  Clemson received their first postseason bid in 1975 to the National Invitation Tournament (NIT).  In 1980, the Tigers reached the Elite Eight of the NCAA tournament, their best NCAA showing in ten berths to date.  Clemson has also reached the final of the NIT twice, in 1999 and 2007.

Seasons

 

  Clemson's 1990 NCAA Sweet Sixteen appearance was vacated by the NCAA Committee on Infractions.

References
General

Specific

 
Clemson Tigers
Clemson Tigers basketball seasons